The 1953 Toledo Rockets football team was an American football team that represented Toledo University in the Mid-American Conference (MAC) during the 1953 college football season. In their third and final season under head coach Clair Dunn, the Rockets compiled a 3–6 record (2–3 against MAC opponents), finished in fourth place in the MAC, and were outscored by their opponents by a combined total of 305 to 113.

The team's statistical leaders included Dave Andrzejewski with 403 passing yards, Mel Triplett with 479 rushing yards, and Rick Kaser with 189 receiving yards.

Schedule

References

Toledo
Toledo Rockets football seasons
Toledo Rockets football